The 2021–22 season is Bristol Rovers' 139th year in their history and first season back in League Two since the 2015–16 season, following relegation the previous season. Along with the league, the club also competed in the FA Cup, the EFL Cup and the EFL Trophy. The season covers the period from 1 July 2021 to 30 June 2022.

Transfers

Transfers in

Loans in

Loans out

Transfers out

Pre-season friendlies
Bristol Rovers announced they would play friendlies against Melksham Town and Havant & Waterlooville as part of their pre-season preparations. On 28 June 2021, the club announced three home friendlies.

Competitions

League Two

League table

Results summary

Results by matchday

Matches
Fixtures for the 2021–22 season were announced on 24 June 2021.

FA Cup

The draw for the first round was made on 17 October 2021 by Kelly Smith and Wes Morgan. The Second Round draw was made on 8 November 2021 by Shaun Wright-Phillips and Rachel Yankey. The Third Round draw was made on 6 December 2021 by David Seaman and Faye White.

EFL Cup

The draw for the First Round was made on 24 June 2021 by Andy Cole and Danny Mills.

EFL Trophy

The Gas were drawn against Chelsea U21s, Cheltenham Town and Exeter City.

Statistics
Players with squad numbers struck through and marked  left the club during the playing season.
Players with names in italics and marked * were on loan from another club for the whole of their season with Bristol Rovers.

|-
!colspan=15|Players out on loan:

|}

Goals Record

Disciplinary Record

References

Bristol Rovers
Bristol Rovers F.C. seasons